The 1997 Arena Football League season was the 11th season of the Arena Football League. It was succeeded by 1998. The league champions were the Arizona Rattlers, who defeated the Iowa Barnstormers in ArenaBowl XI.

Standings

 Green indicates clinched playoff berth
 Purple indicates division champion
 Grey indicates best regular season record

Playoffs

All-Arena team

References